The following is a list of notable people from Hokkaido.

Musicians

Asami Abe
Natsumi Abe
Morio Agata
Umeko Ando
Aya
Rion Azuma
Miki Fujimoto
Nanami Hashimoto
Masato Hatanaka
Ryōhei Hirose
DJ Honda
Takashi Hosokawa
Akira Ifukube
Kaori Iida
Fumito Iwai
Jiro
Saya Kawamoto
Asami Kimura
Saburō Kitajima
Makoto Kitayama
Hikaru Kotobuki
Mai
Masaki Yamada
Chiharu Matsuyama
Michiya Mihashi
Miz
Yutaka Mizutani
Koichi Morita
Hideki Naganuma
Ken Narita
Maki Nomiya
Kiyofumi Ohno
Oki
Yuuki Ozaki
Anna Saeki
Maya Sakura
Masaru Sato
Shela
Mikuni Shimokawa
Takuro
Kōji Tamaki
Teru
Misuzu Togashi
Miyoshi Umeki
Miho Yabe
Ichiro Yamaguchi
Miwa Yoshida
Yuki
Hiroaki Zakōji

Sportspeople

Seiji Aochi
Ken Fujikawa
Shoko Fujimura
Chisato Fukushima
Michiko Fukushima
Yumie Funayama
Takuya Furuya
Seiko Hashimoto
Manabu Horii
Hamuko Hoshi
Takashi Iizuka
Sumie Inagaki
Shiho Ishizawa
Daiki Ito
Seizo Izumiya
Shoji Jo
Noriaki Kasai
Kazuya Kawabata
Makoto Kawashima
Shohei Kiyohara
Yukari Konishi
Masayuki Kono
Shuhei Kuji
Kazuyuki Kyoya
Hitoshi Matsushima
Kohei Mitamura
Koji Mitsui
Osamu Miura
Yuji Miura
Tōru Mori
Keiichiro Nagashima
Daisuke Naito
Tomoka Nakagawa
Yuki Nakai
Tatsuki Nara
Masahiro Nasukawa
Satoru Noda
Kimie Noto
Yoshiaki Numata
Daisuke Obara
Saori Obata
Ayumi Ogasawara
Masafumi Ogawa
Yasunori Ogura
Yūya Oikawa
Mayumi Oiwa
Takanobu Okabe
Tetsuya Okabe
Tomomi Okazaki
Masumi Ono
Takayuki Ono
Hideyuki Osawa
Misaki Oshigiri
Hiroya Saitō
Takeshi Saito
Tetsuya Saito
Shota Sakaki
Kazumasa Sasaki
Jin Sato
Shoichi Sato
Yoshinori Sato
Riko Sawayanagi
Ryo Shibata
Hiroki Shibuya
Hiroyasu Shimizu
Seiichi Sugano
Kazuhiko Sugawara
Kota Sugawara
Tomo Sugawara
Toshihiro Sugiura
Hideki Suzuki
Kentaro Suzuki
Masahito Suzuki
Takahito Suzuki
Takao Suzuki
Maki Tabata
Miho Takagi
Nana Takagi
Katsunari Takahashi
Seiji Takahashi
Yoko Takahashi
Kazuhiro Takami
Megumi Takase
Shota Takekuma
Kohei Tanaka
Masami Tanaka
Toshiaki Tanaka
Sakurako Terada
Tomahawk T.T.
Yugo Tsukita
Sakie Tsukuda
Makoto Tsuruga
Rempei Uchida
Hideaki Ueno
Koichi Wajima
Tsutomu Wakamatsu
Shane Williamson
Megumi Yabushita
Hirokazu Yagi
Hiromi Yamamoto
Ayatsugu Yamashita
Takafumi Yamashita
Takuro Yamashita
Shinya Yanadori
Junki Yokono
Keiichi Zaizen
Nobuyuki Zaizen

Hokkaido
Hokkaido